The 11th Pan American Games were held in Havana, Cuba from August 2 to August 18, 1991.

Medals

Silver

Men's Middleweight (– 86 kg): José Vera
Women's Lightweight (– 56 kg): Altagracia Contreras

Bronze

Women's Half Middleweight (– 61 kg): Eleucadia Vargas

Men's Freestyle (– 48 kg): José Sabino
Men's Greco-Roman (– 48 kg): José Sabino

Results by event

See also
 Dominican Republic at the 1992 Summer Olympics

Nations at the 1991 Pan American Games
P
1991